Sun was a brig built in 1819 at Sunderland and was condemned at the Cape of Good Hope (the Cape) in August 1822. She was repaired and began sailing east of the Cape. She was wrecked in May 1826 in the Torres Strait.

Career
Sun first appeared in Lloyd's Register (LR) in the 1820 volume.

On 21–22 July 1822 a tremendous gale drove Sun, Murray, master, ashore at the Cape of Good Hope. She had been nearly loaded for London. A letter dated 10 August stated that the greater part of Suns cargo had been saved, but that she had been condemned. 

The next report was that it was expected that Sun would be gotten off the shore. After being condemned, Sun was sold, gotten off, repaired, and fitted out. She was expected to sail to Bengal under the name George Ballard. There is no further mention in online resources of George Ballard.

Instead, Sun retained her name and continued to sail, but trading as a country ship, i.e., east of the Cape. She was registered at the Cape in 1823, and may later have transferred her registry to Calcutta, though she does not appear in an 1825 list of vessels registered there.

Sun, Anderson, master, arrived in Bengal on 2 March 1823 from the Cape of Good Hope.  She returned to the Cape on 19 November. On 1 February 1824 Sun, Griffiths, master, sailed from the Cape for Bengal. She arrived there on 21 May.

She sailed with a cargo of tea from Canton, China on 28 November 1825 to Van Diemens Land. Leaving the River Derwent on 16 March 1826, she sailed to Sydney arriving on 24 March.

Loss
Under the command of Captain W. Gillett, on 11 May 1826 Sun left on a voyage from Sydney to Batavia. On the way she struck a reef off Eastern Fields, north-east of Thursday Island, and was wrecked with the loss of 24 of the 36 people on board. The survivors made for Murray Island, where the vessels John Munro and Industry rescued them. The brig was reported to be carrying 40,000 Spanish dollars.

The account states that Industry rescued the crews of both Venus and Sun. By other accounts, Venus was wrecked on 1 July 1826 on the Alerts Reef;  rescued her crew.

Notes

Citations

References
 
 

1819 ships
Ships built on the River Wear
Maritime incidents in July 1822
Age of Sail merchant ships of England
Merchant ships of the United Kingdom
Maritime incidents in May 1826
Shipwrecks of the Torres Strait